The Royal Ulster Academy (RUA) has existed in one form or another since 1879. It started life then, as The Belfast Ramblers' Sketching Club drawn from the staff of Marcus Ward & Co who held their first show in Ward's Library on Botanic Avenue in 1881. In 1890, it became The Belfast Art Society; later, in 1930, its name was changed to "The Ulster Academy of Arts" and Sir John Lavery was elected its first President; finally, in 1950, King George VI conferred the title The Royal Ulster Academy of Arts upon the institution.

The organisation invited entries for their 1941 annual show from artists serving in the armed forces, from which twenty entrants were chosen and shown in a special section at the exhibition.

After many years of falling standards at the Annual exhibition Anne Crookshank, Curator of Art at the Ulster Museum, pruned the show down to just thirty-seven works for the 1958 show. By 1970 the organisation was floundering, and no student or avant-garde artist would have been interested in showing with them. When Patric Stevenson took the President's role in 1970 he personally oversaw the stabilisation of its finances and preservation of its records. Standards began to improve after T P Flanagan took the reins in 1978 as he held considerable influence over his students at the Belfast College of Art, in encouraging participation from younger and more adventurous artists. Others such as Raymond Piper, Neil Shawcross, and later Joe McWilliams and Bob Sloan did similarly. During David Evan's Presidency from 1983 to 1993 the Academy's Annual show was held at Queen's University, Belfast before returning to the Ulster Museum under Rowel Friers.

Today the Royal Ulster Academy of Arts (RUA) is a flourishing artists' organization. Many of Ireland's most distinguished artists are exhibiting members of the Academy.

Its Annual Exhibition is the largest, open art exhibition in Northern Ireland, attracting many hundreds of artist entrants from Ireland and elsewhere.

Presidents of the Academy have included Sir John Lavery R.A, Morris Harding, William Conor, Mercy Hunter, T.P. Flanagan, Joe McWilliams and Rita Duffy. The present president is Betty Brown PRUA. Academicians include Basil Blackshaw, Victor Sloan, T.P. Flanagan, Graham Gingles, Jean Duncan, Neil Shawcross and Jack Pakenham.

The RUA Mission Statement is: The Royal Ulster Academy is an artist led organisation which promotes both traditional and contemporary approaches to visual art through its exhibition and education program.

2013 Exhibition
At the 132nd annual exhibition, held at the Ulster Museum in Belfast “The Kiss” by artist Paul Walls  was not displayed as then president Colin Davidson and vice president Paul Seawright believed the subject matter, two women kissing, was deemed inappropriate for school visitors.

References

External links 
Royal Ulster Academy
Arts Council of Northern Ireland

Art societies
Academies of arts
Culture of Northern Ireland
Arts organisations based in Northern Ireland